Antoni Malczyk (1902 – 1972), Polish footballer, brother of Stanisław
 Stanisław Malczyk (1910 – 1973), Polish footballer, brother of Antoni.